DeLamater is a surname. Notable people with the surname include:

Cornelius H. DeLamater (1821–1889), American industrialist
John DeLamater (1940–2017), American sociologist and sexologist